Johanne Blouin (born September 19, 1955), is a Canadian singer-songwriter. She won the Félix Award twice for her albums Merci Félix (1988) and Johanne Blouin (1989).

Blouin was born in Saint-Hyacinthe, Quebec, Canada.

Discography
 Merci Felix (Les Productions Guy Cloutier, 1988)
 Johanne Blouin (Les Productions Guy Cloutier, 1989)
 Sainte Nuit (Les Productions Guy Cloutier, 1990)
 Entre L'Amour Et La Guerre (Les Productions Guy Cloutier, 1992)
 Souviens-Moi (L'Etoile Du Nord, 1993)
 Noels D'espoir with Michel Legrand (L'Etoile Du Nord, 1994)
 Chante Noel (Du Nord, 1994)
 Elle Le Dira (L'Etoile Du Nord, 1995)
 Que Veux-tu Que J'te Dise (L'Etoile Du Nord, 1998)
 Everything Must Change (Justin Time, 2000)
 Until I Met You with Vic Vogel (Justin Time, 2004)
 Rose Drummond (2005)
 Lui (Musicor, 2010)
 French Kiss (Pyramide Bleue, 2014)

References

 Biography on The Canadian Encyclopedia

Canadian singer-songwriters
Félix Award winners
French-language singers of Canada
1955 births
People from Saint-Hyacinthe
Living people
Singers from Quebec
Canadian women pop singers
21st-century Canadian women singers